Rajinder Singh, MBE (Punjabi: ਰਜਿੰਦਰ ਸਿੰਘ), more popularly known as the 'Skipping Sikh', is a British-Indian septuagenarian health and fitness personality.

Career 
During the 2020 COVID-19 pandemic, Singh started sharing exercise videos to inspire older members of the Asian community to stay healthy whilst also raising money for the NHS.

In 2021 Singh was invited to watch tennis in Wimbledon from the royal box. In the same year he also fulfilled a lifelong dream by running his first marathon at the age of 74.

He arrived in the UK from India in 1970 after his father, a soldier in the British Indian Army, encouraged him to build a better life abroad.

Awards 

 He was awarded an MBE in the 2020 Queen's Birthday Honours List for services to health and fitness which he dedicated to India.
 He was awarded a Points of Light award in 2020 from the Prime Minister Boris Johnson.

References 

Living people
Indian emigrants to the United Kingdom
1940s births